Fox Chase is a neighbourhood of Lower Paxton Township in metropolitan Harrisburg located in Dauphin County, Pennsylvania.

Harrisburg–Carlisle metropolitan statistical area